Ryan Massoud Roushandel (born November 11, 1985) is an American soccer player and coach.

Youth career
Roushandel started his collegiate career at Clemson University, going all the way to the semifinals of the NCAA Tournament as a redshirt freshman. After two years at Clemson, Roushandel opted to use his final three years of eligibility at the University of Central Florida.

Club career
After stints in Costa Rica with Brujas FC and Puerto Rico with Sevilla FC Puerto Rico, Roushandel returned to the US, where he coached with UCF Knights and Oglethorpe Stormy Petrels.

Roushandel signed with NASL club Atlanta Silverbacks in 2014.

On May 5, 2016, Roushandel signed for San Antonio FC. He joined Wilmington Hammerheads on a one-game loan on July 30, 2016.

Roushandel retired in 2019, in order to join San Antonio FC's coaching staff.

However, Roushandel came out of retirement on September 14, 2019, playing thirty minutes of a 3–1 win over Oklahoma City Energy.

References

External links
Silverbacks player profile

1985 births
Living people
American soccer players
Association football defenders
Atlanta Silverbacks players
Austin Aztex players
Clemson Tigers men's soccer players
Marist School (Georgia) alumni
North American Soccer League players
People from Alpharetta, Georgia
San Antonio FC players
Sevilla FC Puerto Rico players
Soccer players from Georgia (U.S. state)
Sportspeople from Fulton County, Georgia
UCF Knights men's soccer players
USL Championship players
Wilmington Hammerheads FC players
USL League Two players
Atlanta Blackhawks players
American soccer coaches